The 2018–19 Scandinavian Cup was a season of the Scandinavian Cup, a Continental Cup season in cross-country skiing for men and women. The season began on 14 December 2018 in Östersund, Sweden and concluded with a stage event 1–3 March 2019 in Madona, Latvia.

Calendar

Men

Women

Overall standings

Men's overall standings

Women's overall standings

References 

Scandinavian Cup
Scandinavian Cup seasons
2018 in cross-country skiing
2019 in cross-country skiing